The 1935 Georgia Bulldogs football team  represented the Georgia Bulldogs of the University of Georgia during the 1935 college football season. The Bulldogs completed the season with a 6–4 record.

Schedule

References

Georgia
Georgia Bulldogs football seasons
Georgia Bulldogs football